Haute-Garonne's 8th constituency is a French legislative constituency in Haute-Garonne.

A by-election was held within the constituency in 2018 after the election of Joël Aviragnet was annulled.  This led to the election of Joël Aviragnet again.  This means the constituency has been held continuously by the socialists since 1988.

Deputies

Election results

2022

 
 
 
 
 
 
 
|-
| colspan="8" bgcolor="#E9E9E9"|
|-
 
 

 
 
 
 
 

* EELV dissident

2018 by-election

2017

2012

2007

 
 
 
 
 
 
 
|-
| colspan="8" bgcolor="#E9E9E9"|
|-

2002

 
 
 
 
 
 
|-
| colspan="8" bgcolor="#E9E9E9"|
|-

1997

 
 
 
 
 
 
 
|-
| colspan="8" bgcolor="#E9E9E9"|
|-

References

External links 
Results of legislative elections since 1958

8